U.S. of Archie is a Saturday morning cartoon show on CBS from September 7 to December 21, 1974. A spin-off of the popular Archie comic books and television show.

It ran for a total of sixteen episodes, but due to its educational agenda, lacked the music and comedy elements which had made the other Archie cartoons so successful. After spending its first four months on Saturday mornings, it was moved to the less-popular Sunday morning schedule in January 1975, where it remained in repeats until September 1976.

Jackie Mills, a Hollywood producer, produced all of the music for U.S. of Archie. Jackie had also produced Bobby Sherman and the Brady Bunch Kids. The lead singer on U.S. of Archie was Tom McKenzie, who earlier appeared on some of the Groovie Goolies'''s songs. Tom was a member of the Doodletown Pipers singing group, which also included Augie Johnson, Oren Waters, Mic "Michele" Bell, Teresa Graves, and Dean Chapman.

Beginning on March 29, 2010, U.S. of Archie started to air on the Retro Television Network.

Plot
The series features Archie, Jughead, and the other Riverdale High student regulars re-enacting famous scenes throughout American history, taking full advantage of the Bicentennial in the months leading up to it. These re-enactments were termed by Archie during the show to be historical accounts featuring the "ancestors" of the current Archie gang; surprisingly, these ancestors were nearly identical to Archie et al.'' and were seemingly close friends of famous people in several eras of American history. It was produced by Filmation founders and producers Lou Scheimer and Norm Prescott.

The musical segments appear after the episode ends, which are songs about the covered topic. The characters were slightly re-drawn with new clothing but some of the animations were recycled.

Voices
Dallas McKennon - Archie Andrews, Hot Dog, Mr. Weatherbee, Chuck Clayton
John Erwin - Reggie Mantle
Jane Webb - Betty Cooper, Veronica Lodge, Miss Grundy
Howard Morris - Jughead Jones, Big Moose Mason

Episodes

References

External links 
 The U.S. of Archie at the Internet Movie Database
 

CBS original programming
1970s American animated television series
1970s American children's comedy television series
1974 American television series debuts
1976 American television series endings
American animated television spin-offs
American children's animated comedy television series
American children's animated education television series
American children's animated musical television series
English-language television shows
Historical television series
Teen animated television series
Television series by Filmation
Television shows based on Archie Comics
United States Bicentennial
Television shows directed by Hal Sutherland